Kaung Sett Naing (Kaung Sat Naing) (born 21 March 1993) is a footballer from Myanmar who plays as a forward for the Myanmar national under-23 football team.

References

1993 births
Living people
Sportspeople from Yangon
Burmese footballers
Myanmar international footballers
Association football forwards
Yangon United F.C. players
Burmese expatriate footballers
Burmese expatriate sportspeople in Thailand
Expatriate footballers in Thailand
Southeast Asian Games silver medalists for Myanmar
Southeast Asian Games medalists in football
Competitors at the 2015 Southeast Asian Games